The 2008 NBA Finals was the championship series of the National Basketball Association's (NBA) 2007–08 season and conclusion of the season's playoffs. A best-of-seven playoff series that was played from June 5 to June 17, 2008, the series was contested between the Eastern Conference champion Boston Celtics and the Western Conference champion Los Angeles Lakers. It was the 11th Finals meeting between the Lakers and the Celtics.

Led by the "Big 3" of Paul Pierce, Kevin Garnett, and Ray Allen, and holding home court advantage, the Celtics defeated the Lakers, led by Pau Gasol and MVP Kobe Bryant, in six games. It was their first title in twenty-two years and their 17th title overall, a record that still stands today even when the Lakers tied this record in 2020. Pierce was named Finals MVP.

Rodd Houston narrated the Boston Celtics' championship season documentary on NBA Entertainment. The made-for-TV version of this documentary is narrated by Kevin Harlan.

Series summary

Note: team in Bold won the game

Background
The Celtics were making their first NBA Finals appearance since a six-game loss to the Lakers in 1987. Over the next 20 years the Celtics would suffer through several lean years, not making the playoffs in nine of those years. Following the dissolution of the team's original "Big Three" through the retirements of Larry Bird and Kevin McHale and the departure of Robert Parish, the Celtics suffered through several tragedies such as: the passing of Reggie Lewis in 1993; a franchise-worst 15-win 1996–97 season; the ill-fated hiring of head coach Rick Pitino; and the deaths of franchise patriarch Red Auerbach and former player Dennis Johnson, which culminated in a 24-win 2006–07 season, highlighted by a franchise-worst 18 straight losses.

The 2007 off-season saw Celtics GM Danny Ainge acquire Ray Allen and Kevin Garnett to join franchise star Paul Pierce. This new formation was widely regarded as the most talent the Boston Celtics team possessed since the duo of Antoine Walker and Paul Pierce graced the floor of the TD Garden in the early 2000s. The newly formed 'Big Three,' joined by second year point guard and future all star Rajon Rondo, led the Celtics to a dramatic 42-game turnaround, finishing with 66 wins. In the playoffs the Celtics were pushed to the brink by the Atlanta Hawks and Cleveland Cavaliers, and despite not winning on the road, they managed to prevail in a pair of Game 7s on their home court. The Celtics would finally break their road woes in a six-game win against the perennial Eastern Conference powerhouse Detroit Pistons, earning their first finals berth since 1987.

After losing to the Pistons in the 2004 NBA Finals despite a talent-laden roster, Phil Jackson abruptly retired. Soon after the Lakers decided to rebuild by trading away Shaquille O'Neal to the Miami Heat for Lamar Odom, Caron Butler and Brian Grant. The 2004–05 season saw the Lakers miss the playoffs for only the fifth time in team history. Even though he had written a book called The Last Season, going as far as calling Kobe Bryant "uncoachable", Jackson returned to the Lakers for the 2005–06 season. Jackson and Bryant would patch their differences, but after a pair of first-round exits, Bryant demanded, but later retracted, a trade in the off-season.

The Lakers' 2007–08 season saw the team win 57 games, along the way adding Spanish forward Pau Gasol in mid-season while Andrew Bynum was recovering from a mid-season knee injury. The Lakers eliminated the Denver Nuggets 4–0, then the Utah Jazz 4–2 and then dethroned the erstwhile defending champion San Antonio Spurs 4–1 in the conference finals, making their 29th NBA Finals appearance.

2008 NBA Playoffs

Regular season series
The Boston Celtics won both games in the regular season series:

Game summaries

All times listed below are Eastern Daylight Time (UTC-4). If the venue is located in a different time zone, the local time is also given.

Game 1

Paul Pierce scored 15 points in the third quarter to give Boston the lead for good, and Kevin Garnett paced the Celtic attack with 24 points and 13 rebounds including a powerful two-handed putback dunk late in the game. Kobe Bryant had 24 points.
	
Pierce apparently injured his knee by falling awkwardly on Kendrick Perkins' leg, and was taken off the court in a wheelchair. Despite what Pierce's reaction suggested was a highly debilitating injury, he returned to action minutes later to raucous cheering from the crowd. Pierce admitted during coverage of the 2019 NBA Finals that he just had to use the bathroom. He soon hit two three-pointers on consecutive offensive possessions that gave Boston the lead for good and finished with 22 points. It was later dubbed by some as the "Wheelchair Game".

The Lakers, who had had home court advantage throughout the first three rounds and had not trailed a series in that same time, now had to do without both luxuries for the first time.

Game 2

The Lakers jumped out to an early 15–8 first quarter lead, but the Celtics answered with a 10–0 run at the start of the second quarter and ended the first half with a 54–42 lead.

The Celtics held a 24-point lead with less than eight minutes to go in the 4th quarter before the Lakers cut the lead to two points with 38.4 seconds to go with a 31–9 run. Paul Pierce and James Posey then closed out the game with two free throws each. The Lakers had a chance to cut into Boston's four-point lead with 14 seconds left, but the possession resulted in a shot by Saša Vujačić that was blocked by Pierce. Kobe Bryant finished the game with 30 points and 8 assists.

Leon Powe, a second year bench player, scored 21 points on 6–7 shooting from the field and 9–13 from the line in 15 minutes of play, including back-to-back dunks in the last minute of the 3rd quarter. Over the course of the game, Leon Powe shot 13 free throws while the Lakers shot 10.

Despite injuries suffered by Pierce (sprained knee) and Kendrick Perkins (high ankle sprain), both players started in Game 2 and appeared to be mostly unhampered by the injuries, especially Pierce who finished with 28 points.

Boston finished the game 27-for-38 from the line, while the Lakers were 10-for-10. Some analysts viewed this as favorable treatment toward the Celtics, while others noted that a difference in playing styles may have led to the discrepancy, and that the actual foul discrepancy was only 28–21 in favor of Boston.

Game 3

The Lakers won game 3 on a strong shooting night from regular season MVP Kobe Bryant, who scored a series-high 36 points, leading the Lakers to their first win of the series and adding to their undefeated streak at home in the 2008 postseason. Saša Vujačić scored 20 points in 28 minutes, Paul Pierce had a poor shooting game, making only two of his 14 field goal attempts. Kevin Garnett also had trouble shooting, finishing with only 12 points. Ray Allen was the only member of Boston's Big Three that scored over 13 points, with 25.

Game 4

The Lakers jumped out to a 35–14 lead after the first quarter, which was the largest first-quarter lead in NBA Finals history. The Lakers held their ground for most of the third quarter, leading by as many as 24 points. However, the Celtics went on a 21–3 run to end the third quarter, closing the deficit to only two points (73–71). With 4:07 remaining in the fourth quarter, the Celtics took their first lead in the game when Celtics' reserve Eddie House made an  jumper. With House's shot, the Celtics were in the lead for good. The Celtics' victory in Game 4 was the largest comeback in the NBA Finals since .

The Celtics bench outscored the Lakers bench 35–15, 29 of those points coming from House and James Posey. Kevin Garnett finished with 16 points and 11 rebounds in support of Allen (19) and Pierce (20).

Game 5

As in Game 4, the Lakers jumped out to an early lead, leading 43–24 with 11 minutes to play in the second quarter. And as in Game 4, the Celtics came back, taking a 62–60 lead behind the strong play of Paul Pierce.

The Lakers finally regained their composure, outscoring Boston 24–18 in the 3rd quarter. In previous games, the Lakers were outscored by Boston in the 3rd quarter (22–31 in Game 1, 19–29 in Game 2, 17–25 in Game 3, and 15–31 in Game 4) by a total of 43 points (73–116).

The Lakers built a 14-point lead in the 4th quarter, but the Celtics again came back with a 16–2 run to tie the game at 90. With less than one minute left in the game, the Celtics had the ball with the Lakers leading 97–95. Pierce beat Bryant off the drive, but Bryant knocked the ball out of Pierce's hands from behind. Lamar Odom picked up the loose ball and passed downcourt to Bryant for a breakaway dunk, giving the Lakers a 99–95 lead. The Lakers went on to win 103–98, sending the series back to Boston.

Kobe Bryant had 25 points, to go with five steals. Pau Gasol contributed 19 points, 13 rebounds and 6 assists, Odom 20 points and 11 rebounds. For Boston, Pierce had a memorable 38 point effort, but outside of Allen (16 points) and Garnett (13 points and 14 rebounds) did not receive enough support from his teammates to clinch the championship at Staples.

As for the odds stacked against the Lakers to come back from a 3–1 deficit, Jackson said, "We're young enough and dumb enough to do this."

Game 6

However, for the 1994 Knicks, the first round was a best-of-five. Since the NBA Finals used the 2-3-2 format from 1985 until 2013, no team has ever won the last two games on the road.

After a rocky first quarter, the Celtics dominated the rest of the game. Maintaining a lead of more than 25 points, the Celtics' Big Three performed phenomenally, while the whole team smothered the Lakers' offense with their tight defense. Boston dominated in numerous statistical categories, including rebounds (48–29, with a 14–2 disparity in offensive boards), turnovers (7–19), steals (18–4), assists (33–16) and blocks (4–0). Five Celtics finished in double figures. Ray Allen hit seven three-pointers to tie what was then the Finals record (which he subsequently broke during the 2010 NBA Finals against the Lakers during game two), Rajon Rondo had an all-around spectacular performance (21 points, 8 rebounds, 7 assists, 6 steals), the Celtics only turned the ball over seven times and set a Finals record with 18 steals, and every Boston player who saw action scored.

The 39-point margin of victory was the largest ever in an NBA championship-clinching game, breaking the old record of 33, also set by the Celtics over the Lakers in Game Five of the 1965 NBA Finals, 129–96. This lead was close to the Finals point-spread record set in Game 3 in  where a Michael Jordan-led Chicago Bulls team beat the Utah Jazz by 42 points, 96–54. The Celtics also improved their overall record against the Lakers to 9–2 in Finals meetings, beating them in the Finals for the first time since 1984.

This was the Celtics' 17th championship, their first since , extending their record for most NBA championships won by a single team. All this capped off the Celtics' best regular season (66–16) since their previous championship season in which they went 67–15.

Later, the Bruins would win the 2011 Stanley Cup Finals, the Red Sox would win two more World Series titles in 2013, and in 2018, and the Patriots would win three more Super Bowls XLIX, LI, and LIII (2014, 2016, and 2018 seasons).

It was also the same identical fashion when the Celtics won the NBA Finals in  before this championship.

Rosters

Boston Celtics

Los Angeles Lakers

Player statistics

Boston Celtics

|-
| align="left" |  || 6 || 6 || 41.0 || .507 || .524 || .867 || 5.0 || 2.5 || 1.3 || 0.7 || 20.3
|-
| align="left" |  || 3 || 0 || 6.3 || .667 || .000 || .000 || 0.3 || 0.7 || 0.3 || 0.0 || 2.7
|-
| align="left" |  || 6 || 0 || 19.5 || .391 || .000 || .750 || 3.2 || 0.7 || 0.5 || 0.5 || 4.0
|-
| align="left" |  || 5 || 0 || 10.1 || .375 || .000 || 1.000 || 0.2 || 1.2 || 0.4 || 0.0 || 3.8
|-
| align="left" |  || 1 || 0 || 14.6 || .500 || .000 || .500 || 4.0 || 0.0 || 0.0 || 0.0 || 3.0
|-
| align="left" |  || 6 || 6 || 37.9 || .429 || .000 || .760 || 13.0 || 3.0 || 1.7 || 1.0 || 18.2
|-
| align="left" |  || 4 || 0 || 18.5 || .357 || .412 || .833 || 2.5 || 2.5 || 0.3 || 0.0 || 8.0
|-
| align="left" |  || 5 || 5 || 18.4 || .571 || .000 || .667 || 3.6 || 0.4 || 0.6 || 1.0 || 4.0
|-! style="background:#FDE910;"
| align="left" |  || 6 || 6 || 38.8 || .432 || .393 || .830 || 4.5 || 6.3 || 1.2 || 0.3 || 21.8
|-
| align="left" |  || 6 || 0 || 25.2 || .500 || .500 || 1.000 || 3.8 || 0.5 || 1.3 || 0.2 || 8.7
|-
| align="left" |  || 6 || 1 || 8.9 || .550 || .000 || .714 || 3.2 || 0.0 || 0.0 || 0.0 || 6.2
|-
| align="left" |  || 6 || 6 || 27.0 || .377 || .000 || .593 || 3.8 || 6.7 || 1.5 || 0.5 || 9.3

Los Angeles Lakers

|-
| align="left" |  || 5 || 0 || 7.0 || .556 || .333 || .500 || 1.8 || 0.2 || 0.2 || 0.2 || 2.6
|-
| align="left" |  || 6 || 6 || 43.0 || .405 || .321 || .796 || 4.7 || 5.0 || 2.7 || 0.2 || 25.7
|-
| align="left" |  || 6 || 0 || 19.2 || .484 || .529 || .750 || 1.8 || 1.3 || 0.3 || 0.5 || 7.0
|-
| align="left" |  || 6 || 6 || 31.2 || .405 || .188 || .824 || 1.5 || 3.2 || 1.5 || 0.0 || 10.8
|-
| align="left" |  || 6 || 6 || 39.0 || .532 || .000 || .647 || 10.2 || 3.3 || 0.5 || 0.5 || 14.7
|-
| align="left" |  || 1 || 0 || 2.8 || .000 || .000 || .000 || 0.0 || 0.0 || 0.0 || 0.0 || 0.0
|-
| align="left" |  || 6 || 6 || 36.7 || .517 || .200 || .643 || 9.0 || 3.0 || 0.3 || 1.0 || 13.5
|-
| align="left" |  || 6 || 6 || 21.3 || .390 || .385 || 1.000 || 4.8 || 1.3 || 0.7 || 0.0 || 7.3
|-
| align="left" |  || 6 || 0 || 10.4 || .500 || .000 || .250 || 0.7 || 0.0 || 0.0 || 0.5 || 1.8
|-
| align="left" |  || 6 || 0 || 22.0 || .391 || .348 || .857 || 2.0 || 0.8 || 0.5 || 0.2 || 8.3
|-
| align="left" |  || 6 || 0 || 11.0 || .313 || .333 || .750 || 1.0 || 1.2 || 0.2 || 0.2 || 2.5

Broadcasting
Produced by ESPN, the Finals were aired on ABC in the United States for the sixth consecutive year. This was also Michele Tafoya's final Finals appearance before resigning before the 2008–09 season. As an NBA Finals sideline reporter, Tafoya was later succeeded by Doris Burke, Rachel Nichols, and Malika Andrews.

International broadcasts
Aside from ABC (U.S.) and TSN (Canada), other broadcasters across the world covered the Finals:

 : Canal 7
 : ESPN
 : Be 1 and Prime Sport 1
 : Great Belize Television and Tropical Vision Limited (all games except games 2 and 5 joined in progress; Sunday games covered in full)
 : OBN
 : ESPN Latin America
 : TSN, NBA on ABC
 : CCTV-5, several provincial broadcasters
 : DK4 Sport
 : Antena Latina
 : Urheilukanava
 : Sport+
 : Premiere Sport
 : Sport+
 : Tele Caraibes
 : ESPN, Cable TV Hong Kong Sports Channel, Star Sports, TVB HD
 : Sport1, Sport2
 : ESPN
 : ESPN, Jak TV, Star Sports
 : Sky sport
 : Sport 5
 : J Sports Plus, NHK BS-1, SkyPerfecTV
 : SBS Sports, Star Sports
 : LTV7
 : TVC
  Middle East, North Africa: ART Sport 3
 : Sport1
 : C/S Sports on RPN, ABS-CBN Basketball TV
 : Canal+Sport1
 : Sport TV 1
 : NBA TV
 : Canal +, Cuatro
 : TV4 AB
 : Videoland
 : ESPN
 : NTV
 : Five
 : Sport Plus
 : Sky TV

Aftermath
In the 2008–09 season the Celtics raced to a 27–2 start, the best through 29 games in NBA history, until that fateful finals rematch against the Lakers on Christmas Day ended a franchise-high 19-game winning streak. Then days after the All-Star Game Kevin Garnett injured his right knee, and was lost for the season. The Celtics won 62 games, but the absence of Garnett affected the team as they were eliminated in seven games by the Orlando Magic in the Eastern Conference Semifinals.

The Lakers rebounded to win 65 games in the aforementioned season, then proceeded to win the NBA title in five games over the Magic. Even though another mid-season injury to Andrew Bynum threatened their title drive, he did come back late in the season. The Lakers became the first team since the 1988–89 Pistons to win the NBA Finals after losing it in the previous year.

Both teams would eventually meet again in 2010 where the Lakers defeated the Celtics in seven games.

The Celtics' 17th championship raised the total of major professional sports championships in Boston to 32, and it continued a string of championships for the city this decade. The NFL's New England Patriots won the Super Bowl in 2001, 2003 and 2004, and nearly won a fourth on Super Bowl XLII, only to have a perfect season denied by the New York Giants four months earlier. Major League Baseball's Boston Red Sox won their second World Series title of the decade eight months earlier, adding their total to seven. With the NHL's Boston Bruins winning the 2011 Stanley Cup Finals, the city of Boston became the first city to win championships in all four major sports in a seven-year span. The city's total title tally now stands at 38.

See also
 Celtics–Lakers rivalry
 Curse of Len Bias – the alleged curse that had kept the Celtics from winning the NBA Finals since 1986, which was broken in this series.

References

External links

National Basketball Association Finals
Finals
NBA
NBA
Basketball competitions in Los Angeles
Basketball competitions in Boston
NBA Finals
NBA Finals
NBA Finals
NBA Finals
NBA Finals

it:NBA Playoffs 2008#NBA Finals: Boston Celtics - Los Angeles Lakers